Muḥammad In‘āmul-Ḥasan Kāndhlawī (20 February 191810 June 1995) was an Indian Islamic scholar who served as the Chief leader or Amir of the Tablighi Jamaat from 1965 to 1995.

Early life and career
Inamul Hasan was born on 20 February 1918 in Kandhla town, near Saharanpur, Uttar Pradesh, India. He received his basic religious education at Madrassa Kashif-ul-Uloom Nizamuddin New Delhi and then at Mazahir Uloom Saharanpur and  then spent the rest of his life working for Tablighi Jamat.

He married Sheikh ul Hadith Muhammad Zakariya Kandhlawi's second daughter. He was appointed the third Ameer (leader) of Tablighi Jamaat by Sheikh-ul-Hadith after the death of Muhammad Yusuf Kandhlawi in 1965 and served over 30 years as the leader of Tablighi Jamaat until his death in 1995.

Death and legacy
Inamul Hasan Kandhlawi died on 10 June 1995. He was well-versed in the ilm-e-Hadith (knowledge of the traditions of Muhammad). During his term, he made a Shura (an advisory body and a consultative system) in every country where the Jamaat was active for smooth functioning of the mission. He discharged his responsibility as the Amir of Tablighi Jamaat with foresight and courage. The then Prime Minister of India PV Narasimha Rao condoled his death.

Bibliography

References

External links
Books in the Urdu language (3 volumes) on the life of Inamul Hasan Kandhlawi on islamicbookcenter.org website

1918 births
1995 deaths
Indian Sunni Muslim scholars of Islam
20th-century Muslim scholars of Islam
Deobandis
Tablighi Jamaat people
People from Shamli district
Emirs of Tablighi Jamaat